2241 Alcathous  is a large Jupiter trojan from the Trojan camp, approximately  in diameter. It was discovered on 22 November 1979, by American astronomer Charles Kowal at the Palomar Observatory in southern California, United States. The dark D-type asteroid belongs to the 20 largest Jupiter trojans and has a rotation period of 7.7 hours. It was named after Alcathous from Greek mythology.

Orbit and classification 

Alcathous is a dark Jovian asteroid orbiting in the trailing Trojan camp at Jupiter's  Lagrangian point, 60° behind its orbit in a 1:1 resonance . It is also a non-family asteroid of the Jovian background population.

It orbits the Sun at a distance of 4.8–5.5 AU once every 11 years and 10 months (4,309 days; semi-major axis of 5.18 AU). Its orbit has an eccentricity of 0.07 and an inclination of 17° with respect to the ecliptic. The body's observation arc begins with a precovery taken at Palomar in June 1950, more than 29 years prior to its official discovery observation.

Physical characteristics 

In the Tholen, Barucci and Tedesco taxonomy, Alcathous is classified as a dark D-type asteroid. It is the 8th largest of all 46 D-type asteroids in the Tholen classification.

Rotation period 

A large number rotational lightcurves have been obtained since December 1991, when Alcathous was first observed by Stefano Mottola with the Loiano 1.52-meter telescope at Bologna Observatory, Italy. In 1994, the asteroid's rotation period was also measured by Giovanni de Sanctis and collaborators.

Several photometric observations between 2010 and 2017, by Daniel Coley and Robert Stephens at the Center for Solar System Studies and at GMARS , also include the so-far best-rated period of 7.689 hours with a brightness amplitude of 0.22 magnitude.

Diameter and albedo 

According to the surveys carried out by the Infrared Astronomical Satellite IRAS, the Japanese Akari satellite and the NEOWISE mission of NASA's Wide-field Infrared Survey Explorer, Alcathous measures between 113.68 and 118.87 kilometers in diameter and its surface has an albedo between 0.044 and 0.048. The Collaborative Asteroid Lightcurve Link adopts the results obtained by IRAS, that is, an albedo of 0.0471 and a diameter of 114.63 kilometers based on an absolute magnitude of 8.64.

Naming 

This minor planet was named after Alcathous, brave and handsome Trojan leader in Homer's Iliad. Alcathous was the husband of Hippodamia  the eldest daughter of Anchises (also see ), who excelled all other girls of her age in beauty, skill and wit. Alcathous, previously uninjured in the Trojan War, was struck by Poseidon (also see ) with blindness and paralysis and was killed easily by a spear thrown by the Greek general and Cretan commander, Idomeneus (also see ). The official naming citation was published by the Minor Planet Center on 10 November 1992.

Notes

References

External links 
 Asteroid Lightcurve Database (LCDB), query form (info )
 Dictionary of Minor Planet Names, Google books
 Discovery Circumstances: Numbered Minor Planets (1)-(5000) – Minor Planet Center
 
 

002241
Discoveries by Charles T. Kowal
Named minor planets
002241
19791122